The Paris-based Swingle Singers recorded regularly for Philips in the 1960s and early 1970s and the successor London-based group continued to record, for Columbia / CBS, Virgin Classics and other record labels from 1974 to the present.

The Swingle Singers (Paris, 1962 – 1973)
Jazz Sébastien Bach (1963) Philips – a.k.a. Bach's Greatest Hits
Going Baroque / de Bach aux Baroques (1964) Philips
Swinging Mozart (1965) Philips – a.k.a. Anyone for Mozart?
Les Romantiques (1965) Philips – a.k.a. Getting Romantic
Swingling Telemann (1966) Philips – a.k.a. Rococo À Go Go
Place Vendôme with the Modern Jazz Quartet (1966) Philips – a.k.a. Encounter
Sounds of Spain: Concerto d'Aranjuez (1967) Philips – a.k.a. Spanish Masters
Operazione San Pietro (movie soundtrack) (1968) C.A.M.
Noëls Sans Passeport (1968) Philips – a.k.a. Christmastime
Jazz Sébastien Bach, Vol. 2 (1968) Philips – a.k.a. Back to Bach
American Look (1969)  Philips
Sinfonia: Luciano Berio conducting the New York Philharmonic and Swingle Singers (1969)  Columbia / CBS
Faisceaux-Diffractions / Swingle Novae (1972) Barclay / Inédits ORTF  (The Swingle Singers appear on Michel Zbar's Swingle Novae, the second side of this LP.)
The Joy of Singing (1972) Philips – a.k.a. Les 4 Saisons, "Le Printemps"
Bitter Ending (1972) Epic

Swingle II / The Swingles / The (New) Swingle Singers (London, 1974 – present)
Madrigals / Love Songs for Madrigals and Madriguys (1974) CBS 80147 / Columbia 
Words & Music (1974) CBS
Rags and All that Jazz (1976) CBS
Lovin' You: Words and Music Vol. 2 (1976) CBS 81546
Baroque (1976) CBS
Luciano Berio and Swingle II - A-Ronne / Cries Of London (1976) Decca
English and French Songs  (1977) RCA
Pieces of Eight (1977) CBS 82305
Swingle Bells (1978) Moss Music Group / EMI
No Time to Talk (1979) CBS
Swingle Skyliner (1979) Moss Music Group / EMI
Folio (1980) Moss Music Group / EMI
The Swingle Singers "Live" in New York '82 (2006) Swing CD R01 (archive release)
Reflections (1985)
Instrumentals (1986), Polydor
Live at Ronnie Scott's (1987)
The Swingle Singers Christmas Album (1987) Swing CD 3 - Made in England
Nothing But Blue Skies (1988) TRAX (Modem 1009)
Azio Corghi: Mazapegul, Ballet for vocal octet and oboe composed in 1985, recorded on Dischi Ricordi CRMCD 1006 (1988)
1812 (1989) Swing CD4, reissued by Virgin Classics (1995) – a mix of 8 studio and 7 live tracks
The Bach Album (1991) Swing CD5, reissued by Virgin Classics as Bach Hits Back (1994) augmented of 5 tracks
A Cappella Amadeus, A Mozart Celebration (1991) Virgin Classics
Around the World, Folk Songs (1991) Virgin Classics – a.k.a. (Around the World) Folk Music
Luciano Berio: Sinfonia, Eindrücke (1992) Erato  – performance with the Orchestre National de France conducted by Pierre Boulez
Notability (1993) Swing CD7
The Story of Christmas (1994) Swing CD8, reissued by Primarily A Cappella (1998)
Pretty Ring Time (1994) Swing CD9
New World (1995) Swing CD10
The Swingle Singers Sing Irving Berlin (1996) Sanctuary Records. Re-issue of Nothing But Blue Skies, The Irving Berlin Songbook, a.k.a. A Celebration of the Voice a.k.a. Top Hat White Tie and Tails (2009)
The Swingle Singers, Live! (1997) Swing CD11
Screen Tested (1998) Swing CD12
Noels San Passeport) (2000)
Ticket to Ride - A Beatles Tribute (1999) Swing CD15, reissued by Primarily A Cappella (2002)
Keyboard Classics (2000) Swing CD16, reissued by Primarily A Cappella (2002) – a.k.a. Dabadaba Classics, King
Live in Japan (2001) Swing CD17 (recorded in December 2000)
Mood Swings (2002) Swing CD18 – Primarily A Cappella, a.k.a. Dabadaba Swing, King
Retrospective: The 40th Anniversary Show (2003) Swing CD19 - Primarily A Cappella (live)
Unwrapped (2004) Swing CD20 - Signum – a.k.a. Just Voices: A Cappella Christmas (Evosound)
The Swingle Singers (2005)
Dido's Lament (2005) Swing CD S01 – EP
Beauty and the Beatbox (2007) Signum – with beatbox artist, Shlomo 
Anthology (2009)
A Celebration of the Voice (2009)
Ferris Wheels (2009) Swing CD22
Spotlight on Bach {2010)
Yule Songs (2011) Swing CD23 – EP
Back to Bach (2012)
Weather to Fly (2013) World Village 
Deep End (2015)
Yule Songs II (2015) 
Folklore (2017)
A Cappella Christmas Favorites (2018)
Snapshots, Volume 1 (2020)
Snapshots, Volume 2 (2021)

Notable compilations
Anyone for Mozart, Bach, Handel, Vivaldi? (1986) Philips / Phonogram France – a single disc combining Anyone for Mozart? (a.k.a. Swinging Mozart) and Going Baroque (a.k.a. de Bach aux Baroques), minus one track from the latter ("Allegro" from Händel's Concerto Grosso Op. 6)
Compact Jazz: The Swingle Singers (1987) Mercury – a single disc compilation of the complete Place Vendôme collaboration of the Paris-based Swingle Singers with the Modern Jazz Quartet (a.k.a. Encounter), complemented with 6 tracks from Getting Romantic and 3 tracks from Spanish Masters / Sounds of Spain
Compilation Album (Reflections & Live at Ronnie Scotts) (1989) Swing CD1/2
Jazz Sebastian Bach (2000)  Philips / Phonogram – a single disc combining Bach's Greatest Hits (a.k.a. Jazz Sébastien Bach) and Back to Bach (a.k.a. Jazz Sébastien Bach 2)
Swingle Singers (2005) Philips – 11 disc boxed set of all 11 Philips recordings (from 1963~1972) by the original Swingle Singers
(Best of) The Swingle Singers (2005) Virgin Classics – a single disc compilation of 15 tracks from the 4 albums from the London-based group published in the early 1990s by Virgin Classics: 1 track from 1812, 5 tracks from Bach Hits Back, 5 tracks from Around the World, Folk Songs and 4 tracks from A Cappella Amadeus, A Mozart Celebration. The same compilation had been published by Virgin France in 1991 with the title Swingle Singers La Compilation
The Swingle Singers: Anthology (2009) Virgin Classics – 4 disc boxed set of the 4 previously released Virgin Classics albums from the London-based group of the late 1980s / early 1990s
Swing Sing (2009) Sony – a single disc compilation of tracks from Swingle II (London) recordings of the 1970s on CBS Records, culled from Rags and All that Jazz (complete), Lovin' You: Words and Music vol. 2 (6 tracks), Words and Music (2 tracks) and No Time to Talk (1 track)
Collection (2011) (SWINGCD-B1) - box set of 3 previously released SWINGCD albums:  Ticket To Ride (1999), Keyboard Classics (2000), and Mood Swings (2002)

Other recordings
Idsteiner Schloss Konzerte 79/80
Sonnets of Desolation / Visions and Spels (1984) Composers Recordings, Inc. (CRI) SD 515 – "features The New Swingle Singers on side one performing Ben Johnston's "Sonnets of Desolation" and the New Verbal Workshop on side two performing Johnston's "Visions and Spels"
Let's All Get Together (1984) – with Ad Libitum and The Bengt Hallberg Trio

References and external links
Swingle Singers web site
[ Swingle Singers discography at allmusic.com]
The Swingle Singers at singers.com
Olive Simpson discography
www.singers.com
bbc.uk
discogs.com
microgroove.jp Philips discography
latitude45arts.com

Vocal jazz discographies
Discographies of French artists
Discographies of British artists